Weber County is a county in the U.S. state of Utah. As of the 2020 census, the population was 262,223, making it Utah's fourth-most populous county. Its county seat and largest city is Ogden, the home of Weber State University. The county was named for the Weber River.

Weber County is part of the Ogden-Clearfield, UT Metropolitan Statistical Area as well as the Salt Lake City-Provo-Orem, UT Combined Statistical Area.

History
The Weber Valley was visited by many trappers seeking beavers and muskrats along its streams. One of the first on record reached the area in 1824, traveling from Fort Bridger. He reported that the Bear River flowed into a salt bay. Peter Skene Ogden passed through in 1826, representing the Hudson's Bay Company. He traded in this area for several years, near present-day North Ogden. John C. Frémont explored the Weber Valley in 1843 and made maps of the area. The Fremont reports encouraged readers to seek their fortunes in the western frontier. Miles Goodyear was a fur trapper who constructed a way station on the Weber River in 1845. In 1847 he sold it to incoming Mormon pioneers. James Brown purchased and changed the site's name to Brownsville (later changed to Ogden).

After the Mormon pioneers began filling out into the future state of Utah, the fledgling government (as of 1849 known as State of Deseret) began a system of government. On January 31, 1850, the legislature provided for the creation of six counties to generally cover the area, named in this order:
 Weber (with Ogden as county seat)
 Great Salt Lake
 Utah
 San Pete
 Tuilla
 Little Salt Lake

The county boundaries were better defined by the 1852 Utah Territory legislature. The borders were adjusted by subsequent acts in 1855, 1856, and 1862. The creation of Nevada Territory in 1862 also administratively reduced the county's territory significantly since its 1852 description had it running to the Sierra Nevada mountains in central California. A final adjustment in 1880 concerning the various lands in the Great Salt Lake area brought the county's borders to their present configuration.

As of the 1852 description, the original Weber County stretched from California in the west, to the Oregon boundary on the north, to a point in the middle Davis County in the south. As Nevada and the State of Utah evolved, Weber County was trimmed so that it now occupies a stretch of the Wasatch Front, part of the eastern shores of Great Salt Lake, and much of the rugged Wasatch Mountains.

Geography
The county extends from high in the Wasatch Range in the east into a portion of the Great Salt Lake to the west, where the county's elongated point exists. The Weber and Ogden rivers and their tributaries run through its valleys. The Weber County Surveyor's office divides the county into two regions, the "Lower Valley" and the "Upper Valley", divided by the ridge of the Wasatch front range south through the county. Lower Valley, adjacent to the Lake, is the county's more populous part. The Upper Valley consists mostly of the Ogden Valley, the watershed of the Ogden River. The county's highest elevation is Willard Peak in the Wasatch Mountains, at 9,763' (2976m) ASL. It is the second-smallest county in Utah by land area and third-smallest by total area.

Major highways

 Interstate 15
 Interstate 84
 U.S. Route 89
 Utah State Route 37
 Utah State Route 39
 Utah State Route 79
 Utah State Route 97
 Utah State Route 108
 Utah State Route 126
 Utah State Route 134
 Utah State Route 162
 Utah State Route 158
 Utah State Route 167
 Utah State Route 203
 Utah State Route 204

Adjacent counties

 Box Elder County - northwest
 Cache County - north
 Rich County - northeast
 Morgan County - southeast
 Davis County - south
 Tooele County - southwest

Protected areas

 Cache National Forest (part)
 Ogden Bay Waterfowl Management Area
 Weber Memorial Park
 Willard Bay Upland Game Management Area (part)

Lakes

 Beus Pond (aka Beus Reservoir)
 Bluebell Spring
 Box Spring
 Bybee Pond (aka Lybee Reservoir)
 Causey Reservoir
 Choke Spring
 Cold Springs
 Cutler Spring
 Deseret Spring (aka Desert Spring)
 Front Hollow Spring
 Glassman Pond
 Great Salt Lake (part)
 Green Pond
 Huntsville Reservoir
 Lime Kiln Spring
 Limestone Spring
 Little Monte Springs
 Lower Dry Bread Pond
 Meadow Creek Pond
 Monastery Spring
 Norma Springs
 Pineview Reservoir
 The Horseshoe Bend
 Twenty-First Street Pond
 Utaba Reservoir

Demographics

2010 census
As of the 2010 United States Census, there were 231,236 people in the county, organized into 78,784 households and 57,867 families. The population density was 351/sqmi (135/km2). There were 86,187 housing units at an average density of 131 per square mile (50/km2). The racial makeup of the county was 85.2% White, 1.4% Black or African American, 1.3% Asian, 0.8% Native American, 0.3% Pacific Islander, 6.59% from other races, and 3.0% from two or more races. 16.7% of the population were Hispanic or Latino of any race.

In the 2000 United States Census, there were 196,533 people in the county, organized into 65,698 households and 49,536 families. The population density was 341/sqmi (132/km2). There were 70,454 housing units at an average density of 122 per square mile (47/km2). The racial makeup of the county was 87.69% White, 1.40% Black or African American, 1.28% Asian, 0.77% Native American, 0.16% Pacific Islander, 6.59% from other races, and 2.12% from two or more races. 12.65% of the population were Hispanic or Latino of any race.

By 2005 80.4% of the population was non-Hispanic whites. 1.5% were African-Americans, while 0.9% were Native Americans. Asians were 1.4% of the population. Latinos were 15.2% of the county population.

There were 78,748 households, of which 36.8% had children under 18 living with them, 56.7% were married couples living together, 11.5% had a female householder with no husband present, and 26.5% were non-families. 21.1% of all households had an individual who was 65 years of age or older, and 7.3% had someone living alone who was 65 years of age or older. The average household size was 2.90, and the average family size was 3.40.

Ages

The median age was 30.7 years. For every 100 females, there were 100.7 males. For every 100 females aged 18 and over, there were 99.0 males.

Income and employment
As of the 2010 census, the median income for a household in the county was $62,036, and the median income for a family was $71,359. Males had a median income of $49,081 versus $34,954 for females. The per capita income for the county was $25,275. 12.1% of the population and 8.7% of families were below the poverty line. Out of the total population, 15.4% of those under 18 and 8.5% of those 65 and older lived below the poverty line.

The 2000 census found the median income for a household in the county was $44,014, and the median income for a family was $49,724. Males had a median income of $36,239 versus $24,719 for females. The per capita income for the county was $18,246. 9.30% of the population and 6.90% of families were below the poverty line. Out of the total population, 11.10% of those under 18 and 5.50% of those 65 and older lived below the poverty line.

In the 2010 census, 67.0% of people over 16 were in labor, and 33.0% were not in labor. The unemployment rate was 3.2%.

Ancestry
As of 2017, the largest self-identified ancestry groups in Weber County, Utah were:

 English (21.6%)
 German (10.5%)
 "American" (7.5%)
 Irish (6.1%)
 Scottish (4.1%)
 Danish (3.9%)
 Italian (3.6%)
 Dutch (3.1%)
 Swedish (3.0%)
 Welsh (1.9%)
 Norwegian (1.9%)

Politics and Government
Like most of Utah, Weber County voters usually vote Republican. In no national election since 1964 has the county selected the Democratic Party candidate. The closest a Democrat has come to winning the county since then was in 1996 when Bill Clinton lost by 10.7 percent to Bob Dole.

Education
Tertiary institutions and organizations of education in Weber County:
 Weber State University
 Ogden–Weber Technical College

The two K-12 school districts in the county are Ogden City School District and Weber School District.

There is also a state-operated school, Utah Schools for the Deaf and the Blind.

Communities

Cities

 Farr West
 Harrisville
 Hooper
 Marriott-Slaterville
 North Ogden
 Ogden (county seat)
 Plain City
 Pleasant View
 Riverdale
 Roy
 South Ogden
 Uintah
 Washington Terrace
 West Haven

Towns
 Huntsville

Townships
 Reese
 Warren
 Weber
 West Weber

Census-designated places
 Eden
 Liberty
 Wolf Creek

Census county division 
 Ogden Valley

Unincorporated communities

 Nordic Valley
 Taylor

Notable residents

 Hal Ashby - film director
 Rodney Bagley - developed catalytic converter
 Gilbert Belnap - pioneer, sheriff of Weber County 1862-1870
 Solon Borglum - sculptor
 Fawn M. Brodie - historian
 John Browning - firearms manufacturer
 Bernard DeVoto - historian
 David Eccles - businessman
 Lester Herrick - pioneer, sheriff of Weber County in 1860
 Jefferson Hunt - founded Huntsville
 J. Willard Marriott - businessman
 Herbert B. Maw - Utah governor
 David O. McKay
 Olene S. Walker - Utah governor

See also
 National Register of Historic Places listings in Weber County, Utah
 Weber County Library System

References

External links
 Ogden County Official Website
 Ogden/Weber Chamber of Commerce
 Ogden/Weber Convention/Visitors Bureau
 Envision Ogden Outdoor recreation directory
 Weber County History from the Utah History Encyclopedia at the University of Utah
 Weber Pathways Public trails in Weber County.
 Ogden Valley Pathways Public trails in Weber County focused on Ogden Valley.
 Weber County Library

 
1850 establishments in Utah Territory
Populated places established in 1850
Wasatch Front